The Miracle Makers is a 1923 American silent drama film directed by W.S. Van Dyke and starring Leah Baird, George Walsh and Edith Yorke.

Synopsis
Doris Mansfield is forced to marry Bill Bruce, despite being engaged to another man. When Bruce is sent to jail for smuggling illegal immigrants, she has a chance to start again with her real love but he believes she has abandoned him and has gone to serve in World War I in Europe.

Cast
 Leah Baird as Doris Mansfield
 George Walsh as Fred Norton
 Edith Yorke as Mrs. Emma Norton
 George Nichols as Captain Joe Mansfield
 Edythe Chapman as Mrs. Martha Mansfield
 Richard Headrick as Doris Mansfield's Baby
 Mitchell Lewis as Bill Bruce

References

Bibliography
 Connelly, Robert B. The Silents: Silent Feature Films, 1910-36, Volume 40, Issue 2. December Press, 1998.

External links
 

1923 films
1923 drama films
1920s English-language films
American silent feature films
Silent American drama films
American black-and-white films
Films directed by W. S. Van Dyke
Associated Exhibitors films
1920s American films